is a railway station on the Saikyo Line in Itabashi, Tokyo, Japan, operated by East Japan Railway Company (JR East).

Lines
Some trains continue northward to  via the Kawagoe Line and southward to  via the TWR Rinkai Line. The station is located 1.8 km north of Ikebukuro Station.

Station layout

The station consists of a single island platform serving two tracks.

The station has a "Midori no Madoguchi" staffed ticket office.

Platforms

History
Itabashi Station opened on 1 March 1885.

Passenger statistics
In fiscal 2011, the station was used by an average of 30,168 passengers daily (boarding passengers only).

The passenger figures for previous years are as shown below.

Surrounding area
 Shin-Itabashi Station (Toei Mita Line)
 Shimo-Itabashi Station (Tobu Tojo Line)
 Tokyo Metropolitan Kitazono High School
 Sugamo High School

References

External links

 Itabashi Station information (JR East) 

Railway stations in Japan opened in 1885
Railway stations in Tokyo